Paolo Kessisoglu (born 25 July 1969, in Genoa, Italy) is an Italian actor, comedian and TV presenter. He is best known for the duo Luca e Paolo, formed with his friend, Luca Bizzarri. Kessisoglu was also a member of the comedian group "Cavalli Marci" (Rotten Horses).

Biography 
Kessisoglu was born in Genoa, Italy to an Armenian family. As a child his paternal grandfather moved with his family from Smyrna (today İzmir, Turkey) to Greece and later to Italy to escape from the Armenian genocide. The family settled in Trieste for several years before finally moving to Genoa. The original surname, Keshishian, during the escape was turkized in Keşişoğlu (with the addition of the patronymic ending -oğlu) to arouse less attention.

In June 2003, Kessisoglu married TV anchor and journalist Sabrina Donadel with whom he has a daughter, Lunitta (b. 2003).

Filmography

Films

Television

References

External links 

1969 births
Living people
Italian male actors
Italian male comedians
Italian people of Armenian descent
Italian people of Turkish descent
Mass media people from Genoa